Sivilla is a river in Innlandet county, Norway. The river is the primary outflow of the lake Savalen, and ends up in the river Glåma.

The river begins at the southeastern side of the lake Savalen at a dam. The river's water is regulated at the dam, where the water is exploited by the  Savalen hydropower station.

See also
List of rivers in Norway

References

Alvdal
Tynset
Rivers of Innlandet